Economy is a basketball mathematical statistical formula that was created in order to determine the ball possession efficiency of ball handlers, mainly primary ball handlers and point guards. It is considered a basic statistic of the top-tier level Greek League.

Calculation
The statistic's formula is:

 (Assists + Steals) - Turnovers

See also
PER
Efficiency
Offensive Rating
Defensive Rating
Tendex
PIR
Basketball Statistics
Fantasy Basketball

External links

Basketball terminology
Basketball statistics